John Dick may refer to:

John Edgar Dick (born 1954), Canadian scientist
John Dick (footballer, born 1876) (1876–?), footballer for Woolwich Arsenal in the 1900s (decade)
John Dick (footballer, born 1930) (1930–2000), footballer for West Ham United in the 1950s and 1960s
John Dick (judge) (1788–1824), United States federal judge
John Dick (minister) (1764–1833), Scottish minister and theologian
John Dick (politician) (1794–1872), American politician and judge
John Dick (rugby union) (1912–2002), New Zealand rugby union player
John Dick (Scottish footballer), Scottish footballer
John C. Dick, Reform Democrat member of the Wisconsin State Assembly from Milwaukee
John H. Dick (1918–2011), college basketball player and U.S. Navy admiral
John Henry Dick (1919–1995), American naturalist and wildlife artist

See also
John Dicks (disambiguation)